Bad books or Bad Books may refer to the following:

 Bad Books (band), an American indie rock band
 Bad Books (album), a 2010 album by Bad Books
 The Bad Book, a 2004 book of collected stories by Andy Griffiths
 The Very Bad Book, a 2010 book of short stories by Andy Griffiths